Classic Rock 96FM was a radio station in Hawke's Bay, New Zealand that broadcast several different formats and eventually became part of the ZM network, operated by New Zealand Media and Entertainment from 1977 to 1988.

Apple Radio and Concert Programme relay
The station was started by Radio New Zealand in 1977 as Apple Radio broadcasting on 730AM. The station was also used to broadcast the Concert Programme into the Hawkes Bay market outside of regular broadcast hours which originally ended at 5pm and later extended to 7pm.

In 1978 after AM band in New Zealand was changed from 10 kHz spacing to 9 kHz spacing, as a result Apple Radio was moved to 765AM.

77ZK
In 1983 the Concert Programme relay was dropped when the Concert Programme began broadcasting on its own full-time frequency, 91.1FM. At the same time programming was extended to evenings and Apple Radio was rebranded as The All New 77ZK and later Hit Radio 77ZK.

Change of format to Adult Contemporary
In 1988 77ZK changed format to play a blend of oldies and adult contemporary music and the station was rebranded as Greatest Hits 77ZK.

Greatest Hits FM96
On 1 December 1989 Greatest Hits 77ZK switched to FM broadcasting on 95.9FM. As a result, the station was rebranded as Greatest Hits FM96. At the same time a secondary frequency was set up in Wairoa on 99.7FM. At this stage the station also ceased broadcasting on 765AM.

96FM
In February 1992 Greatest Hits FM96 became known as Better Music 96FM with an increase in live programming outside of breakfast.

Change of format to Classic Rock
In October 1992 the station changed format to classic rock and the station was rebranded as Classic Rock 96FM. 
This was the final format and name change for the station before being replaced with network brand Radio Hauraki in 1998.

Change of ownership
In 1996 the station was sold to The Radio Network after Radio New Zealand sold their commercial operation, the sale included Classic Rock 96FM

Station closure and replacement with Radio Hauraki
In 1996 The Radio Network purchased radio company Prospect Media Limited which included several radio station in Auckland including former pirate radio station Radio Hauraki. In July 1998 The Radio Network replaced Classic Rock 96FM with the Auckland-based Radio Hauraki with the station branded as Radio Hauraki 96FM.

Replacement with 96ZM
In March 1999 Radio Hauraki was replaced with the Auckland-based version of ZM branded as 96ZM and during the 2000s branded as 95-9 and 99-7 ZM. Radio Hauraki returned to the Hawkes Bay market in 2000 on 99.9FM.

In December 2010 the 99.7FM Wairoa relay was discontinued and now used to relay Classic Hits 89.5 Hawke's Bay into the Wairoa area.

References

Hawke's Bay, ZM
Mass media in Napier, New Zealand
Defunct radio stations in New Zealand